AZ Cygni (BD+45 3349) is a large red supergiant (M3 Iab) in the constellation of Cygnus. It is located 2,090 light years from Earth. It has been studied by the CHARA array in order to understand the surface variations of red supergiants.

Observation history

AZ Cygni was first observed in the Bonner Durchmusterung catalogue, published by Friedrich Argelander in 1903. It has since then been included in many star surveys and catalogues, including the Two-Micron Sky Survey, 2MASS, Tycho-2 Catalogue and Gaia (DR2 and DR3).

From 2011 to 2016, it was observed using the Michigan Infra-Red Combiner (MIRC) at the six-telescope Center for High Angular Resolution Astronomy Array (CHARA array) to investigate the evolution of surface features on red supergiants. These observations were used to derive the fundamental stellar parameters of the star, reconstruct images of the star and test models of 3D radiative hydrodynamics in red supergiants.

Physical parameters

Luminosity
Although the distance is potentially unreliable due to a very high amount of astrometric noise, rated at a significance of 47.4, anything above a rating of 2 is 'probably significant'.

Radius

The radius of AZ Cygni was estimated at  based on the angular diameter and Gaia parallax in a 2021 study. This was an average using the angular diameter and Gaia parallaxes.

Temperature and spectral type

In a 1989 paper it was estimated that AZ Cygni would have spectral types of between M2Iab and M4Iab.  A study in 2000 estimated that the spectral type of AZ Cygni is M3.1Iab.  The spectral type of AZ Cygni was estimated at M3 Iab in a 2002 paper.

A paper in 2004 estimated that the effective temperature of AZ Cygni is 3,200 K with a spectral type of M3 Iab.  AZ Cygni had 3 different effective temperature estimates in a paper in 2019 derived from model spectra: 4,000 K, 4,100 K and 3,867 K with an average of  K.  In another study in 2021 AZ Cygni would have three effective temperature estimates based on the best fitting atmosphere models: 4,000 K, 4,000 K and 3,972 K and also mentions that it is an M2–4.5 Iab star.

Mass

A paper in 2021 estimated three mass estimates equal to  based on the best fitting atmosphere models.

Surface features

AZ Cygni has a complex surface, with large and small features that vary over different timescaeles. Patterns of large convection cells, varying over periods of more than a year, are combined with smaller hot granules of rising gas that vary over shorter timescales. The size of the larger surface features is in line with models of 3D radiative hydrodynamics in red supergiants.

Notes

See also

References

M-type supergiants
Cygnus (constellation)
Cygni, AZ
TIC objects
J20575942+4628004
Semiregular variable stars
Durchmusterung objects